A Symphony of British Music is the official soundtrack album of the 2012 Summer Olympics closing ceremony. It became available as digital download on 12 August 2012 and as a two-disc CD on 20 August 2012.
It features studio recordings of the performances at the closing ceremony for the London Games.

Track listing

See also 

 “Survival”: the official song for the London 2012 Olympics
 Isles of Wonder: official soundtrack album of the London 2012 Olympics opening ceremony

References

2012 soundtrack albums
2012 Summer Olympics
Decca Records soundtracks
Pop compilation albums
2012 in British music
Olympic albums